Baldersby is a village and civil parish in the Harrogate district of North Yorkshire, England, about  west of Thirsk and  north-east of Ripon on the A61. According to the 2001 census the parish had a population of 253, increasing to 285 at the 2011 census.

Baldersby has a farm shop, an Anglican Mission Room, and a cricket ground with a pavilion and children's play area. The nearest primary school is Baldersby St. James C of E Primary School in nearby Baldersby St James.

The Roman road Dere Street forms the western boundary of the parish, now followed by the A1(M) motorway.  Baldersby Gate Interchange, Junction 50 of the A1(M), connects the A61 to the A1(M) in the south of the parish.

Etymology
The name Baldersby may be derived from that of the Norse god, Balder, though more probably it is from a personal name Baldhere (-by = homestead) and indicates that the area of the village may once have been a Viking settlement. The village appears in the Domesday Book of 1086 as Baldrebi and in the early 13th century as Baldeby.

History 
At the time of the Domesday Book Baldersby was held by Count Alan of Brittany.  It later passed to Fountains Abbey.  From the 17th to the 19th centuries the manor formed part of the estates of the Dukes of Devonshire.

Baldersby was historically a township in the parish of Topcliffe in the North Riding of Yorkshire.  The township became a separate civil parish in 1866, and in 1974 was transferred to the new county of North Yorkshire.

Between 1848 and 1959 the village was served by Baldersby railway station.

References

External links 
 
 

Villages in North Yorkshire
Civil parishes in North Yorkshire